The 1969–70 British Home Championship Home Nations international football tournament was a heavily contested series which contradicted the common view that it would be little more than a warm-up for the English team prior to the 1970 FIFA World Cup, at which they were to defend the title they had won on home soil four years earlier. They had won the two previous tournaments and were considered much stronger than the other three home nations, none of whom had qualified for the finals in Mexico. The English however struggled in their opening fixture, drawing with the Welsh away, and although they subsequently beat the Irish, were unable to overcome the Scots. Scotland had a good opening to the campaign, but drew their last two games, whilst Wales salvaged parity following a victory over Northern Ireland in their final fixture. Since goal difference was not at this time used to determine position, England, Wales and Scotland shared the trophy. Had modern scoring techniques been in place, England would have won, followed by the Welsh and the Scots.

Table

Results

References

External links
Full Results and Line-ups

1970
1970 in British sport
1969–70 in Northern Ireland association football
1969–70 in English football
1969–70 in Welsh football
1969–70 in Scottish football